Joseph Moran (1880–?) was a Welsh footballer who played as an outside left mainly for Doncaster Rovers.

Playing career
Bangor born Moran was first known as an Aston Villa player, though he made no appearances for them. In 1903 he moved to play for Doncaster Rovers in the Midland League and had a successful season there, scoring 12 league goals. Following that season Doncaster were elected to the Football League and Moran moved to Leicester Fosse then in the Second Division, though he only made one appearance for them, without scoring, in November 1904 against Lincoln City.

References

1880 births
Date of death unknown
Footballers from Bangor, Gwynedd
Welsh footballers
Association football wingers
English Football League players
Aston Villa F.C. players
Doncaster Rovers F.C. players
Leicester City F.C. players